Deep Red is a 1994 American sci-fi thriller television film directed by Craig R. Baxley, written by D. Brent Mote, and starring Michael Biehn and Lindsey Haun. It aired on the Sci-Fi Channel on March 12, 1994.

Plot
An alien substance known as "Deep Red" infects a young girl named Gracie, causing unusual effects. A scientist named Dr. Newmeyer sets out to capture her, but she is protected by a security expert named Joe Keyes.

Cast
 Lindsey Haun as Gracie Rickman
 Michael Biehn as Joe Keyes
 Tobin Bell as Warren Rickman
 Daniel W. Barringer as Milkman #1
 John Alden as Milkman #2
 John de Lancie as Thomas Newmeyer
 Lisa Collins as Mrs. Rickman
 Chayse Dacoda as Lydia
 Michael Des Barres as Lew Ramirez
 Kevin Page as Patrolman
 John Kapelos as Mack Waters
 Steven Williams as Det. Sgt. Eldon Hames
 Jamie Stern as Hotel clerk
 Joanna Pacula as Monica Quik
 Hank Cheyne as Bradley Parker
 Jesse Vint as Det. Rhodes
 Jack Andreozzi as Janitor
 Eric Fleeks as Deputy Medical Examiner
 José Rey as Desk Sergeant

Release
Deep Red was first broadcast on the Sci-Fi Channel on March 12, 1994, followed by its video release on June 29, 1994.

References

External links
 

1994 television films
1994 films
1994 science fiction films
1994 thriller films
1990s American films
1990s English-language films
1990s science fiction thriller films
American science fiction thriller films
American thriller television films
Films directed by Craig R. Baxley
Films scored by Gary Chang
Syfy original films